The New Iberia Sugar Boys were a minor league baseball team based Alexandria, Louisiana. In 1920, the Sugar Boys played as members of the short–lived Class D level Louisiana State League, as New Iberia folded from the league in a shortened season. The Sugar Boys hosted home games at the New Iberia Park and were succeeded by the 1924 New Iberia Cardinals of the Evangeline League.

History
In 1920, the New Iberia "Sugar Boys" began play as charter members of the Class D level Louisiana State League. The Abbeville Sluggers, Alexandria Tigers, Lafayette Hubs,  Oakdale Lumberjacks and Rayne Rice Birds joined Alexandria in beginning league play on April 20, 1920.

The use of the "Sugar Boys" nickname ties to local sugar cane agriculture and history. Today, New Iberia remains home to the annual "Louisiana Sugar Cane Festival."

During their first season of play, the Sugar Boys folded during the season. On July 6, 1920, the New Iberia and the Rayne Rice Birds teams both folded. Shortly after, the Louisiana State League itself permanently folded on July 14, 1920. Managed by Daniel Gandolfi, the Sugar Boys were in a battle for 1st place with a 36–25 record when the team folded during the season. When New Iberia and Rayne simultaneously folded on July 6, 1920, it left the league with four teams for the next eight days of league play. Oakdale had won the first–half title and the Abbeville Sluggers had the best second–half record when the league folded. Overall, the Oakdale Lumberjacks finished 1.0 game ahead 2nd place New Iberia Sugar Boys (36–25) in the final standings. They were followed by the Lafayette Hubs (36–31), Abbeville Sluggers (33–35), Rayne Rice Birds (30–33) and Alexandria Tigers (23–47) in the final 1920 Louisiana State League standings.

New Iberia was without minor league baseball until the 1934 New Iberia Cardinals began play as members of the Class D level Evangeline League.

The ballpark
The 1920 New Iberia Sugar Boys hosted minor league home games at the New Iberia Park. The ballpark was located at Marie Street & Parkview Drive. Today, New Iberia City Park is still in use as a public park with ballfields and other amenities. The park is located at 300 Parkview Drive.

Year–by–year record

Notable alumni
The player roster for the 1920 New Iberia Sugar Boys is unknown.

References

External links
Baseball Reference
Defunct minor league baseball teams
Defunct baseball teams in Louisiana
Baseball teams established in 1920
Baseball teams disestablished in 1920